Ribeira Seca is a freguesia ("civil parish") in the municipality of Calheta in the Portuguese Azores. The population in 2011 was 1,025, in an area of 53.77 km2. It contains the localities Aveiro, Caldeira de Cima, Caminhos Novos, Canada de Baixo, Faja da Entre Ribeiras, Fajã da Figueira, Fajã da Fonte Nicolau, Fajã das Cubres, Fajã de Além, Fajã do Belo, Fajã do Sanguinhal, Fajã do Santo Cristo, Fajã dos Bodes, Fajã dos Vimes, Fajã Redonda, Grotão Fundo, Loiral de Baixo, Loiral de Cima, Lomba, Pojal, Portal, Ribeira Seca, São Bartolomeu and Silveira.

Architecture

Civic
 Manorhouse of the Noronhas, a 16th-century Baroque manorhouse, constructed by the prestigious Noronha family;

Religious
 Sanctuary of Santo Cristo da Caldeira
 Church of São Tiago

References

Freguesias of Calheta, Azores